Bamboo Love is a 3D animated series of shorts aimed at preschoolers first aired in 2019. The show features the titular Bamboo Love, a panda, who loves to learn new things with the help of her animal friends.

Each episode is three minutes long, and airs on TVOkids, Ici Radio-Canada Tele and Knowledge Kids as an interstitial program. There are currently two seasons of Bamboo Love, with twenty-six episodes per season.

2019 Canadian television series debuts
2010s Canadian children's television series
TVO original programming